The Korea EP is an EP by American hard rock band Powerman 5000. The EP was released as a limited-edition CD during the band's South Korea tour in August 2005. During the band's time in South Korea, they performed at the Rolling Hall in Seoul and was scheduled to perform at the Busan Rock Festival, but was cancelled due to visa issues. The EP includes four Powerman 5000 songs that do not appear on any other official release. However, a live version of "Heroes and Villains" was later included on the band's studio album Destroy What You Enjoy. The Korea EP was also available for purchase at shows during the Return to the City of the Dead Tour '07, and eventually became available on the official Powerman 5000 website.

"Last Night on Earth", "Riot Time", and "That's the Way It Is" were all previously featured in the 2004 video game WWE SmackDown! vs. RAW.

Track listing

Credits
Spider One - vocals
Adrian, AKA Mr7 - drums
Siggy *00* - bass
Johnny Rock Heatley - guitar
Terry Corso - guitar

References

2005 EPs
Powerman 5000 albums